Vidadala Rajini is an Indian politician, Minister for Health, Family Welfare & Medical Education in the Government of Andhra Pradesh and  a Member of Legislative Assembly from Chilakaluripet (Assembly Constituency) in the state of Andhra Pradesh. She contested her first election to Andhra Pradesh Legislative Assembly in the year 2019 as a YSR Congress Party Candidate and won the seat by defeating the TDP Candidate Prathipati Pulla Rao.

References 

Living people
Andhra Pradesh MLAs 2019–2024
People from Guntur district
1999 births
YSR Congress Party politicians